Kućan Ludbreški is a village in Croatia. It is connected by the D24 highway.

References

Populated places in Varaždin County